János Riheczky (23 August 1903 – 19 February 1976) was a Hungarian wrestler. He competed in the men's freestyle middleweight at the 1936 Summer Olympics.

References

External links
 

1903 births
1976 deaths
Hungarian male sport wrestlers
Olympic wrestlers of Hungary
Wrestlers at the 1936 Summer Olympics
Martial artists from Budapest